Lochiel is a populated place located three miles west-southwest of Linntown in Union County, Pennsylvania, United States.

References

Unincorporated communities in Union County, Pennsylvania
Unincorporated communities in Pennsylvania